The Grand Island metropolitan area, as defined by the United States Census Bureau, is an area consisting of four counties in Nebraska, anchored by the city of Grand Island. It was upgraded from a micropolitan area and Hamilton County was added in 2012 when Grand Island's population surpassed 50,000.

As of the 2000 census, the MSA had a population of 68,305 (a July 1, 2009 estimate placed the population at 71,596).

Counties
Hall
Hamilton
Howard
Merrick

Communities
Places with 50,000 or more inhabitants
Grand Island (Principal City)
Places with 1,000 to 5,000 inhabitants
Aurora
Central City
St. Paul
Wood River
Places with 500 to 1,000 inhabitants
Alda
Cairo
Doniphan
Places with less than 500 inhabitants
Chapman
Clarks
Cotesfield
Cushing
Dannebrog
Elba
Farwell
Giltner
Hampton
Hordville
Howard City
Marquette
Palmer
Phillips
Silver Creek
Stockham
Unincorporated places
St. Libory

Demographics
As of the census of 2000, there were 68,305 people, 26,111 households, and 18,190 families residing within this area. The racial makeup of this area was 90.79% White, 0.34% African American, 0.28% Native American, 0.89% Asian, 0.11% Pacific Islander, 6.53% from other races, and 1.06% from two or more races. Hispanic or Latino of any race were 11.32% of the population.

The median income for a household in this area was $35,079, and the median income for a family was $41,317. Males had a median income of $27,809 versus $19,997 for females. The per capita income for this area was $16,293.

See also
Nebraska census statistical areas

References

Hall County, Nebraska
Merrick County, Nebraska
Howard County, Nebraska